Baghdad is a 7-inch EP, released by American punk rock band The Offspring on May 15, 1991. It is currently out of print, but sold 3000 copies within one week of its release. Although Baghdad has never been reissued on CD in its entirety, the title track, "Baghdad", was included on the Rock Against Bush, Vol. 1 compilation from Fat Wreck Chords. The band's official website does not list Baghdad in the discography.

Track listing

Track notes
The EP includes an early version of "Get It Right", of which a later version was released on their second studio album Ignition. The title track "Baghdad" was a re-recording of the song "Tehran" which appeared on the Offspring's debut self-titled album in 1989. It switches the words "Tehran" (the capital of Iran) for "Baghdad" (the capital of Iraq). The EP includes a cover version of "Hey Joe" composed by Billy Roberts, which was later re-recorded for the Go Ahead Punk... Make My Day compilation in 1996 (that same recording was released on the "Gone Away" single and Happy Hour!). A previously unreleased instrumental track "The Blurb", which would not appear on any future releases, served as the basis for an early version of "Genocide", as well as "Change the World".

Personnel

 Bryan Holland – Vocals, guitar
 Noodles – Guitar
 Greg K. – Bass
 Ron Welty – Drums

See also
List of anti-war songs

References

The Offspring EPs
1991 debut EPs